Vetta is a 1984 Indian Malayalam-language drama film directed by Mohanroop. It stars Mohanlal, Mammootty, Sreenivasan, Adoor Bhasi, and Balan K. Nair in major roles. The musical score was composed by M. G. Radhakrishnan.

Plot

Cast 
 Mohanlal as Balan
 Mammootty as Ratheesh
 Adoor Bhasi 
 Sreenivasan 
 Balan K. Nair 
 T. G. Ravi 
 Ravindran 
 Prameela 
 Anjali Naidu

Soundtrack
The film's music consists of four tracks composed by M. G. Radhakrishnan and sung by K. J. Yesudas and Seema Behan.

References

External links 
 

1984 films
1980s Malayalam-language films